The 2007 Ohio Valley Conference men's basketball tournament took place February 27 – March 3, 2007. The first round was hosted by the higher seeded team in each game. The semifinals and finals took place at Gaylord Entertainment Center in Nashville, Tennessee. Eastern Kentucky won the tournament and advanced to the NCAA tournament. Eastern Kentucky drew a 16 seed, facing the number one seeded University of North Carolina.

Format
The top eight eligible men's basketball teams in the Ohio Valley Conference receive a berth in the conference tournament.  After the 20 game conference season, teams are seeded by conference record.

Bracket

Sources
 First round scores and recap. 
 Second round scores and recap.
 Eastern Kentucky advances to NCAA Tournament.

References

Tournament
Ohio Valley Conference men's basketball tournament
Basketball competitions in Nashville, Tennessee
College sports tournaments in Tennessee
Ohio Valley Conference men's basketball tournament
Ohio Valley Conference men's basketball tournament
Ohio Valley Conference men's basketball tournament